Grant McArthur Enfinger (born January 22, 1985) is an American professional stock car racing driver. He competes full-time in the NASCAR Craftsman Truck Series, driving the No. 23 Chevrolet Silverado for GMS Racing. Before moving up to the Truck Series, Enfinger competed full-time in the ARCA Menards Series with GMS and won the 2015 series championship.

Racing career

ARCA Racing Series

After previously competing on short tracks in the southeastern United States as well as in the 2007 Snowball Derby, a race in which he posted the fastest lap, Enfinger began competing in the then-ARCA Re/Max Series in 2008, competing in four races during that season and continued racing in the series on a limited basis during the next two seasons. His best finish, second, occurring twice in 2009 at Chicagoland Speedway and Kentucky Speedway. During this period he primarily drove for a family-owned team, which merged with RAB Racing in 2010.

Moving to Allgaier Motorsports for 2011, Enfinger competed in his first full season in ARCA, winning one pole at Berlin Raceway and finishing fourth in series standings at the conclusion of the 2011 season.

Enfinger would race a limited schedule in 2012, running events for Allgaier Motorsports, BRG Motorsports and Team BCR Racing. In what would be a breakout season, he would make 9 starts for Team BCR in 2013, collecting his first ARCA Racing Series win at his home track of Mobile Speedway and following that with a win at Iowa later in the season.

2014 would start off in record fashion, with Enfinger winning the first 3 races of the season (Daytona, Mobile, and Salem). He would follow that up with a win at Elko for his 4th win of the season. Prior to the race at Lucas Oil Raceway in July, it was announced that Enfinger, who was second in points at the time, would be moving from the Team BCR Ford to GMS Racing, taking his No. 90 and sponsor Motor Honey with him. Allegiant Travel will provide additional sponsorship. Enfinger finished 4th in his first race for GMS at IRP, but crashed at Pocono with Frank Kimmel. The next race at Berlin Raceway, Enfinger dominated, leading 181 of 200 laps to win the Federated Auto Parts 200 and move within 25 points of the points leader Mason Mitchell. He would move within 20 points of the lead after winning at DuQuoin State Fairgrounds Racetrack, earning him the Bill France Four Crown Award. In spite of his six wins, Enfinger would finish second in points to Mitchell after an engine failure and a crash in the final two races respectively.

Enfinger won the season-opening race at Daytona again in 2015. After winning five additional races, he won his first ARCA championship at the end of the season.

NASCAR

In 2010, Enfinger made his first career start in the NASCAR Camping World Truck Series, finishing 22nd. Enfinger attempted to compete in the NASCAR Camping World Truck Series season-opening event at Daytona International Speedway, but failed to qualify for the event. In October, he ran in the truck races at Talladega Superspeedway and Martinsville Speedway.

In October 2011, it was announced that Enfinger would be moving up to the top level of American stock car racing competition, the Sprint Cup Series, with Sinica Motorsports, a start-up team founded by Argentine businessman George Sinica. The team intended to run a limited schedule of 10 to 15 races in the Cup series during the 2012 season. Enfinger attempted his first race for the team at the 2011 Sprint Cup Series finale at Homestead-Miami Speedway, where he failed to qualify for the event.

In December 2011, Enfinger was released from his contract by Sinica Motorsports. Neither he nor the Sinica-owned team attempted any Sprint Cup starts in 2012. Instead, Enfinger ran in the Camping World Truck Series in 2012 for Bragg Racing Group at Daytona International Speedway, and also competed at Rockingham Speedway in the No. 60 for Turn One Racing. He returned to the series in August at Bristol with Allgaier Motorsports. He raced at Las Vegas for Brad Keselowski Racing in the No. 29.

Enfinger returned to the Truck Series in 2016, driving the No. 33 Chevrolet Silverado full-time for GMS Racing. He began the year off with a bang winning his first career pole for the NextEra Energy Resources 250 at Daytona, the season opener, he would finish 20th though in the race after being caught up in the "big one" with six laps to go of the race. He finished in the top 5 in the next race, at Atlanta. But, he was still demoted to a part-time role with the No. 24, and replaced by Kaz Grala and Ben Kennedy in the No. 33. Enfinger ran 5 races later in the season for Gallagher's No. 24 team. For the running of the Fred's 250 at Talladega, Enfinger would start 2nd and would run great all race long, leading the most laps and getting his first career Truck win.  This proved to be Enfinger's last race for Gallagher, although he ran the last race of the season at Homestead with RBR Enterprises.

ThorSport Racing hired Enfinger to drive the No. 98 Toyota Tundra full-time in 2017. He finished 11th in the standings.

In 2018, ThorSport Racing switched to the Ford F-150. Enfinger scored his second career win at Las Vegas and finished fifth in the standings.

In 2019, Enfinger clinched the NASCAR Gander Outdoors Truck Series Regular Season Championship following the Michigan race. He was eliminated from the playoffs at Las Vegas when he finished 31st after experiencing an engine failure that also plagued three other trucks. Ilmor, the manufacturer of the engines, took responsibility for the NT1 engines that suffered from severe detonation due to the combination of the high engine load condition combined with the extreme weather conditions in Las Vegas. Despite Ilmor's announcement, NASCAR denied ThorSport's request to reinstate Enfinger and Johnny Sauter into the playoffs. He finished 7th in the final points standings despite winning no races, with teammate Matt Crafton winning his third career championship and also had no wins.

In 2020, Enfinger broke a 28-race winless streak by winning the season opener at Daytona over Jordan Anderson by 0.010 seconds in overtime, his third career victory and 100th win for Ford in the series. He scored three more wins at Atlanta, Richmond, and Martinsville; the Atlanta and Richmond victories came when he passed leaders Austin Hill and Crafton with one and seven laps to go respectively, while his Martinsville win enabled him to qualify for the Championship Round. Enfinger was the lone non-GMS Racing driver in the final four. He would finish fourth in points.

Due to a lack of sponsorship, Enfinger was reduced to a part-time schedule in 2021, as he shared the No. 98 with former Kyle Busch Motorsports driver Christian Eckes. On March 1, 2021, it was announced that at Las Vegas in March, which was one of Eckes' races in the No. 98, Enfinger would drive the No. 9 truck for CR7 Motorsports, normally driven by the team's owner, Codie Rohrbaugh. Enfinger won the fall race in Las Vegas in 2018. On April 26, CR7 announced that Enfinger would return to the No. 9 in the race at Kansas, which was the next race where Eckes was in the No. 98.

On May 29, 2021, it was announced that Enfinger would make his debut in the Xfinity Series in the race at Charlotte that day. He drove the No. 26 for Sam Hunt Racing. With the race having practice and qualifying (and therefore, a field of only 36 cars instead of the usual 40) and the car being slowest in practice, normal driver Brandon Gdovic decided to step out of the car. Despite never having been in an Xfinity car, Enfinger did qualify for the race. However, he crashed out after making contact with the #13 MBM Motorsports Ford of Chad Finchum.

On October 1, 2021, GMS Racing announced that Enfinger would return to the team in 2022 and drive their No. 23 truck full-time in 2022 and 2023, replacing Chase Purdy. Champion Power Equipment will also move with Enfinger from ThorSport Racing and CR7 Motorsports and sponsor him at GMS for the majority of both years.

Enfinger began the 2022 season with a 29th place finish at Daytona. He scored three top-fives and seven top-10 finishes to make the playoffs. During the playoffs, Enfinger scored his first win of the season at Indianapolis Raceway Park.

Other racing
In March 2019, Enfinger made his Michelin Pilot Challenge sports car debut at Sebring International Raceway, driving a Ford for Multimatic Motorsports alongside ThorSport Racing teammates Matt Crafton, Ben Rhodes, and Myatt Snider.

Personal life
Enfinger was born in Fairhope, Alabama, located in Baldwin County on the Gulf of Mexico, in 1985. Enfinger attended the University of South Alabama, graduating in 2007 with a bachelor's degree in marketing.

Enfinger married Michelle Dupre on January 16, 2016, in Fairhope, Alabama. They have one son, Carson, born in June 2021.

Motorsports career results

NASCAR
(key) (Bold – Pole position awarded by qualifying time. Italics – Pole position earned by points standings or practice time. * – Most laps led.)

Sprint Cup Series

Xfinity Series

Craftsman Truck Series

 Season still in progress
 Ineligible for series points

ARCA Menards Series
(key) (Bold – Pole position awarded by qualifying time. Italics – Pole position earned by points standings or practice time. * – Most laps led.)

ARCA Menards Series East

References

External links

 
 Official profile at GMS Racing
 
 

Living people
1985 births
People from Fairhope, Alabama
Racing drivers from Alabama
NASCAR drivers
ARCA Menards Series drivers
University of South Alabama alumni
NASCAR Truck Series regular season champions
Multimatic Motorsports drivers
Michelin Pilot Challenge drivers